Kamenná may refer to places:

Czech Republic
Kamenná (České Budějovice District), a municipality and village in the South Bohemian Region
Kamenná (Jihlava District), a municipality and village in the Vysočina Region
Kamenná (Šumperk District), a municipality and village in the Olomouc Region
Kamenná (Třebíč District), a municipality and village in the Vysočina Region
Kamenná Horka, a municipality and village in the Pardubice Region
Kamenná Lhota, a municipality and village in the Vysočina Region

Slovakia
Kamenná Poruba, Vranov nad Topľou District, a municipality and village in the Prešov Region
Kamenná Poruba, Žilina District, a municipality and village in the Žilina Region